The Selenidiidae are a family of parasitic alveolates in the phylum Apicomplexa.

Taxonomy

There are five genera in this family.

History

This family was created by Brasil in 1907.

Description

References

Apicomplexa families